The 2001 NCAA Rifle Championships were contested at the 22nd annual NCAA-sanctioned competition to determine the team and individual national champions of co-ed collegiate rifle shooting in the United States. The championship was hosted by Ohio State University at the Lt. Hugh W. Wylie Range in Columbus, Ohio. 

Two-time defending champions Alaska once again topped the team standings, finishing 108 points (6,283–6,175) ahead of Kentucky. This was the Nanooks' third consecutive and fourth overall team title.

The individual championships, for smallbore rifle and air rifle, went to Matthew Emmons (Alaska). Emmons became the third person to win both individual titles during the same year.

Qualification
With only one national collegiate championship for rifle shooting, all NCAA rifle programs (whether from Division I, Division II, or Division III) were eligible. A total of nine teams contested this championship.

Results
Scoring:  The championship consisted of 120 shots by each competitor in smallbore and 40 shots per competitor in air rifle.

Team title

Individual events

References

NCAA Rifle Championship
NCAA Rifle Championships
2001 in shooting sports
NCAA Rifle Championships